Yunji may refer to:

 Yunji, Hamadan, a village in Hamadan Province, Iran
 Yunji, Chongqing, a town in Changshou District, Chongqing, China
 Yunji, Hunan, a town in Hengyang County, Hunan, China
 , Jiangyou, Sichuan, China
 , Xiling District, Yichang, Hubei, China